

Canadian Football News in 1946
The WIFU resumed play for the first time since 1942. The IRFU increased their season play from 6 games to 12 games, per team.

The Montreal Alouettes came into existence. The Regina Roughriders unofficially changed their name to become the Saskatchewan Roughriders. The name change eventually became official on April 1, 1950.

Air travel was used for the first time as the Toronto Argonauts flew to Winnipeg to play pre-season games against the Blue Bombers.

Regular season

Final regular season standings
Note: GP = Games Played, W = Wins, L = Losses, T = Ties, PF = Points For, PA = Points Against, Pts = Points
{| cellspacing="10"
| valign="top" |

| valign="top" |
{| class="wikitable"
|+ Interprovincial Rugby Football Union! Team !! GP !! W !! L !! T !! PF !! PA !! Pts
|- align="center"
| align="left" | Montreal Alouettes || 12 || 7 || 3 || 2 || 211 || 118 || 16
|- align="center"
| align="left" | Toronto Argonauts || 12 || 7 || 3 || 2 || 140 || 124 || 16
|- align="center"
| align="left" |Ottawa Rough Riders || 12 || 6 || 4 || 2 || 175 || 128 || 14
|- align="center"
| align="left" |Hamilton Tigers || 12 || 0 || 10 || 2 || 78 || 234 || 2
|}
| valign="top" |

|}
Bold text means that they have clinched the playoffs.

Grey Cup playoffs
Note: All dates in 1946

 Semifinals 

The Toronto Balmy Beach Beachers will play the Hamilton Wildcats in the ORFU Final.

The Hamilton Wildcats will play the Toronto Balmy Beach Beachers in the ORFU Final.

 Finals 

The Winnipeg Blue Bombers won the total-point series by 30–21. Winnipeg advances to the Grey Cup game.

The Toronto Balmy Beach Beachers will play the Toronto Argonauts in the Eastern finals.

The Toronto Argonauts will play the Toronto Balmy Beach Beachers in the Eastern finals.

Eastern Finals

The Toronto Argonauts advance to the Grey Cup game.

Playoff bracket

Grey Cup Championship

1946 Eastern (Combined IRFU & ORFU) All-StarsNOTE: During this time most players played both ways, so the All-Star selections do not distinguish between some offensive and defensive positions.1st Team
QB – Frank Gnup, Hamilton Wildcats
FW – Ken Charleton, Ottawa Rough Riders
HB – Royal Copeland, Toronto Argonauts
HB – Joe Krol, Toronto Argonauts
HB – Virgil Wagner, Montreal Alouettes
E  – Dick Groom, Hamilton Tigers
E  – Bert Haigh, Ottawa Rough Riders
C  – Doug Turner, Toronto Balmy Beach Beachers
G – Benny Steck, Montreal Alouettes
G – Bill Zock, Toronto Argonauts
T – Herb Trawick, Montreal Alouettes
T – Hank Christman, Ottawa Rough Riders2nd Team
QB – Frank Dunlap, Ottawa Rough Riders
FW – Don McFarlane, University of Western Ontario
HB – Bob McFarlane, University of Western Ontario
HB – Don Toms, Hamilton Wildcats
HB – Johnny Lake, Toronto Balmy Beach Beachers
E  – George Turnbull, University of Western Ontario
E  – Len Wright, Hamilton Wildcats
C  – Don Loney, Toronto Argonauts
G – Don McKenzie, Toronto Balmy Beach Beachers
G – Rudy Grass, University of Toronto
T  – Don Durno, Toronto Indians
T  – Vic Ghetti, Windsor Rockets

1946 Western (Western Interprovincial Football Union) All-StarsNOTE: During this time most players played both ways, so the All-Star selections do not distinguish between some offensive and defensive positions.QB – Walter Dobler, Winnipeg Blue Bombers
FW – Bill Wusyk, Calgary Stampeders
HB – Sully Glasser, Regina Roughriders
HB – Paul Rowe, Calgary Stampeders
HB – Bill Ordway, Winnipeg Blue Bombers
E  – Johnny Bell, Regina Roughriders
E  – Nate Shore, Winnipeg Blue Bombers
C  – Mel Wilson, Winnipeg Blue Bombers
G – David "Sneaky" Adams, Calgary Stampeders
G – Bill Ceretti, Winnipeg Blue Bombers
T – Andrew Nagy, Regina Roughriders
T – Martin Gainor, Winnipeg Blue Bombers

1946 Ontario Rugby Football Union All-StarsNOTE:''' During this time most players played both ways, so the All-Star selections do not distinguish between some offensive and defensive positions.
QB – Frank Gnup, Hamilton Wildcats
HB – Don Toms, Hamilton Wildcats
HB – Ross McKelvey, Toronto Indians
DB – Johnny Lake, Toronto Balmy Beach Beachers
E  – Len Wright, Hamilton Wildcats
E  – Johnny Farmer, Toronto Indians
FW – Fred Kijek, Toronto Indians
C  – Doug Turner, Toronto Balmy Beach Beachers
G  – Don McKenzie, Toronto Balmy Beach Beachers
G  – Trip Trepanier, Sarnia Imperials
T  – Don Durno, Toronto Indians
T  – Vic Ghetti, Windsor Rockets

1946 Canadian Football Awards
 Jeff Russel Memorial Trophy (IRFU MVP) – Joe Krol (RB), Toronto Argonauts
 Jeff Nicklin Memorial Trophy (WIFU MVP) - Bill Wusyk (WR), Calgary Stampeders
 Gruen Trophy (IRFU Rookie of the Year) - Bernie Brennan (HB), Ottawa Rough Riders
 Imperial Oil Trophy (ORFU MVP) - Frank Gnup - Hamilton Wildcats

References

 
Canadian Football League seasons
Grey Cups hosted in Toronto